Sharon Weber is an American gymnastics official best known for taking the Judge's Oath at the 1984 Summer Olympics in Los Angeles. She was the first woman to take the judge's oath at the Olympic Games.

Weber was honored by the Fédération Internationale de Gymnastique (FIG - International Gymnastics Federation) as an honorary judge in January 2005 for her officiating work at all levels of gymnastics (US, World Championships, Summer Olympics).

References
Copy of January 2005 FIG letter honoring Weber.
IOC 1984 Summer Olympics
USA Gymnastics January 2007 selection of judges for the 2007 Elite season, including Weber.
USA Gymnastics March 23, 2008 news on the passing of Weber's daughter.
Wendl, Karel. "The Olympic Oath - A Brief History" Citius, Altius, Fortius (Journal of Olympic History since 1997). Winter 1995. pp. 4,5.

American gymnasts
Living people
American referees and umpires
Year of birth missing (living people)
Olympic officials
Gymnastic judges
Oath takers at the Olympic Games